The Golden Hawk is a 1948 historical adventure film by the American writer Frank Yerby.  It was his third published novel, and was a popular success ranking sixth on the Publishers Weekly list of bestselling novels that year.

Adaptation
In 1952 it was adapted into a film of the same title released by Columbia Pictures. It was directed by Sidney Salkow and featured Rhonda Fleming, Sterling Hayden and John Sutton.

References

Bibliography
 Brown, Stephanie. The Postwar African American Novel: Protest and Discontent, 1945-1950. University Press of Mississippi, 2011.
 Goble, Alan. The Complete Index to Literary Sources in Film. Walter de Gruyter, 1999.
 Hill, James Lee. Anti-heroic Perspectives: The Life and Works of Frank Yerby. University of Iowa, 1976. 
 Korda, Michael. Making the List: A Cultural History of the American Bestseller, 1900–1999 : as Seen Through the Annual Bestseller Lists of Publishers Weekly. Barnes & Noble Publishing, 2001.

1948 American novels
American historical novels
Novels by Frank Yerby
Dial Press books
Novels set in the 17th century
American novels adapted into films